Vladimir Kostin (born 21 January 1976) is a Kazakhstani speed skater. He competed in two events at the 2002 Winter Olympics.

References

1976 births
Living people
Kazakhstani male speed skaters
Olympic speed skaters of Kazakhstan
Speed skaters at the 2002 Winter Olympics
People from Kyzylorda
Speed skaters at the 1996 Asian Winter Games
Speed skaters at the 1999 Asian Winter Games
Speed skaters at the 2003 Asian Winter Games
Speed skaters at the 2007 Asian Winter Games
21st-century Kazakhstani people